Lost My Brain! (Once Again) is the first of two solo albums from Mike "Cyco Miko" Muir – lead singer of Suicidal Tendencies and Infectious Grooves. It was released in January 1996 on the Epic Records label. 2001 saw the release of a follow-up album, Schizophrenic Born Again Problem Child.

Musically, it is more akin to the hardcore punk of Suicidal Tendencies albums to come – namely Freedumb in 1999 – rather than of old, and certainly unlike the funk metal of Infectious Grooves, in spite of the fact that many of the musicians performed for both bands. The title track later appeared, with changed lyrics, under the name "Big Fat Baby" on the Suicidal Records compilation, Friends & Family, Vol. 1 in 1997.

All the songs from this album (except "Cyco Miko Wants You" and "Ain't Mess'n Around") were re-recorded for Suicidal Tendencies' 2018 album Still Cyco Punk After All These Years.

Track listing 
All songs written by Cyco Miko.
"I Love Destruction"		– 2:55
"All I Ever Get"		– 4:15
"F.U.B.A.R."			– 2:50
"All Kinda Crazy"		– 5:09
"Gonna Be Alright"		– 4:32
"Save a Peace for Me"		– 6:25
"Nothing to Lose"		– 4:02
"Ain't Gonna Get Me"		– 3:27
"Lost My Brain Once Again"	– 4:09
"It's Always Something"	– 3:38
"Cyco Miko Wants You"		– 4:31
"Ain't Mess'n Around"		– 5:55

Credits 
 Mike "Cyco Miko" Muir – vocals
 Steve Jones – guitar, except tracks 7, 8, 10, 11
 Adam Siegel – guitar, except tracks 1, 9, 12
 Dave Kushner – guitar, except tracks 1–4, 9, 12
 Dave Silva – bass
 Greg Saenz – drums
 Recorded at Titan Studios, California
 Produced and mixed by Michael Vail Blum and Mike Muir
 Engineered by Michael Vail Blum
 Mixed at Saturn Sound, California
 Mastered by Kevin Hayunga at Sony Music Studios
 Cover photography by Adam Siegel

References

External links 
Cyco Miko, Suicidal Tendencies, and Infectious Grooves website

1996 albums